GSD may refer to:

Places 
 Garsdale railway station, England (GB CRS code)
 Georgia School for the Deaf, Cave Spring, Georgia, United States
 Harvard Graduate School of Design, Gund Hall, Cambridge, Massachusetts, US

Science and technology

Biology and medicine 
 Genetic significant dose
 German shepherd dog
 Global Species Database
 Glutathione synthetase deficiency
 Glycogen storage disease

Other uses in science and technology 
 GSD microscopy
 GSD chemical file format
 Geometric standard deviation
 Graphical system design
 Ground sample distance

Other uses 
 Gender and sexual diversity
 Gibraltar Social Democrats, a political party in Gibraltar
 Go Skateboarding Day
 General sewing data or garment sewing data, in a predetermined motion time system
 Great Sun of Discovery, in the dating system used by the Improved Order of Red Men
 Government shutdown

See also
 General Security Directorate (disambiguation)
 General Staff Department (disambiguation)
 GSD&M, an American advertising agency
 GSDP or gross domestic product
 GSDS (disambiguation)